Seth Riggs (born September 19, 1930) is an American singer, actor, and vocal coach. He has created the vocal technique "Speech Level Singing", and has worked with performers such as Prince, Michael Jackson, Stevie Wonder, José José, Ray Charles, Madonna, Johnny Hallyday, Sohyang, AGNEZ MO, Bette Midler, Julio Iglesias and Barbra Streisand.

Early life, education, and career
Riggs started singing when he was about 7 years old, and joined the Washington National Cathedral Boys' Choir as a 9-year-old. Riggs has been a vocal coach since 1949, when he was serving in the Navy as a gunner. He "received his music education from Peabody Conservatory of Music and Manhattan School of Music", and also received a B.A. in drama from Johns Hopkins University. After receiving the Distinguished Alumnus Award from the Peabody Conservatory, Riggs gave a masterclass which Richard Cassilly attended, and afterwards asked Riggs to help him with his voice. Riggs studied voice with teachers including American baritone John Charles Thomas and Italian tenor Tito Schipa, and in New York City with Keith Davis who was at the time teaching the majority of singers on Broadway.

Riggs conducts workshops and masterclasses around the world, as well as teaches private lessons together with his wife, recording- and performing artist as well as voice teacher Margareta Svensson Riggs.

SLS (Speech Level Singing)
Riggs created SLS that blended singers’ head voice and chest voice while applying SLS (speech level singing) techniques that benefited Prince, Stevie Wonder, Madonna, Barbra Streisand, and numerous others. In 1995 SLS's CEO, Dave Stroud, developed a teaching platform, which was implemented in 2000, requiring all of SLS's vocal teachers to undergo lessons and testing from one or more of seven SLS master classes and would be tested and approved if they were to be associated with Seth Riggs.

Personal life
Riggs is married to singer Margareta Svensson, The two met when  Svensson came to Seth Riggs for singing lessons in 1995. In 2008, they became a couple, and four years later, in 2012, they married and their daughter Samantha was born.

Bibliography 
 Singing For The Stars – A Complete Program For Training Your Voice (1992, Alfred Music)
 American Idol Singer's Advantage: Male Version (2008, Hal Leonard Corporation)

References

External links 

Understanding the Speech Level Singing Method, by Seth Riggs

1930 births
Living people
American vocal coaches
American male singers
People from Rockville, Maryland
People from Los Angeles